"Devil's Deal" is a song by The Zutons which became their first single release. One of its B-Sides, "Zutonkhamuun", was later a B-side on "Pressure Point" as an alternate extended version.

Track listing
 Devil's Deal
 Six Foot Man
 Zutonkhamuun

References

2002 singles
The Zutons songs
2002 songs
Songs written by Dave McCabe